Erodius is a figure in Greek mythology, the son of Autonous (son of Melaneus) and Hippodamia.

The following biological taxons are named after this character:
 , a genus of beetles in the tribe  of family  (darkling beetles)
 Erodius (subgenus), a subgenus within the above genus